Pamela Leila Rai (born March 29, 1966, in New Westminster, BC, Canada) is a former  freestyle and butterfly swimmer who represented Canada from 1980 to 1987.  Rai competed at the 1984 Summer Olympics in Los Angeles, California where she won an Olympic bronze medal in the 4 × 100-metre medley relay, with teammates Anne Ottenbrite, Reema Abdo and Michelle MacPherson.  Rai successfully represented Canada at many international meets throughout her career. Other notable accomplishments include University of Victoria Athlete of the Year 1986, City of Victoria Athlete of the Year 1985, 1983 Hapoel Games silver, 1983 Pan American Games silver, and  1986 Commonwealth Games gold medals.  From 1984 to 1987 Rai swam for the University of Victoria, where she dominated Canadian university women's swimming. Rai is currently a high school math and social justice teacher and a certified yoga instructor trained in India of the Sivananda lineage. She is an honored inductee to the BC Sports Hall of Fame, the Swim BC Hall of Fame, the University of Victoria Legacy Hall of Fame and the Delta Sports Hall of Fame. Rai is the first woman in the world of Indian ancestry, and the first Indo-Canadian to win an Olympic medal.

In 1964, Rai's father, Harinder Jit Singh Rai was the first Indo-Canadian to qualify for an Olympic Games (field hockey). His stellar skills led him to score the only goal at the qualifying match enabling Canada's field hockey team entry to the Olympic games for the first time.  Just prior to the 1964 Olympic Games in Tokyo, Japan, he was removed from the team by officials who favoured an all-white contingent. Rai dedicated her 1984 Olympic success to her father who died from leukemia 3 months prior to her competing in the games.

See also
 List of Olympic medalists in swimming (women)

External links
  (archive)
 
 

1966 births
Living people
Canadian female freestyle swimmers
Canadian sportspeople of Indian descent
Canadian people of Punjabi descent
Commonwealth Games gold medallists for Canada
Commonwealth Games medallists in swimming
Medalists at the 1984 Summer Olympics
Olympic bronze medalists for Canada
Olympic bronze medalists in swimming
Olympic swimmers of Canada
Pan American Games medalists in swimming
Pan American Games silver medalists for Canada
Sportspeople from New Westminster
Swimmers at the 1983 Pan American Games
Swimmers at the 1984 Summer Olympics
Swimmers at the 1986 Commonwealth Games
University of Victoria alumni
Medalists at the 1983 Pan American Games
20th-century Canadian women
21st-century Canadian women
Medallists at the 1986 Commonwealth Games